M. Louise Thomas (Russell; 1861-1947) was the founder of Lenox Hall, a girls' school in St. Louis.

Early life and education
Minnie Louise Russell was born in 1861, the daughter of Judge Thomas Allen Russell (1834-1921), who was for some years a judge of the Circuit Court in St. Louis, and Martha Louisa Lenoir (1831-1913).

Born during the war in Columbia, Missouri, and coming to live in St. Louis while a little girl, Louise Russell was educated in the public schools and graduated from the High School. The graduating exercises were held in a hall so spacious as to make it difficult to hear the essays, and the entertainment naturally became very monotonous to the audience. Russell said to herself, "when my turn comes I will make them hear me," and she did. Her clear and well-modulated voice at once attracted the attention of the guests and she was well rewarded, for the applause was so great as to call for an encore. That was the beginning of her success as a speaker. Her gift was much in demand in public and social life. 

Russell attended the University of Missouri, where she won the gold medal awarded by the Press Association at their annual meeting for the greatest excellence in oratory. This was the first occasion which presented itself for asserting her belief for equal rights for women. The boys preferred to have two gold medals awarded, one for them and another for the girls, making the contests separate and apart. An indignation meeting was held by the girls. Having been subjected to the same rules they could see no reason for discrimination, wanting to come in on an equal footing on this competition as well as on the examinations. The rules were made over and the privilege granted. The winner was Minnie Louise Russell. She believed that all women should be permitted to enter any field of labor or study for which they feel fitted.

Career
While Thomas was married, every luxury and comfort was hers, but when it became necessary to support herself and two daughters, she obtained a position to teach in Hardin College and Conservatory of Music, Mexico, Missouri, where she could keep her children with her. There she established the course of lectures to girls which she calls "Round Table Talks" and which were continued in her school. Not being able to reach each girl individually in the classroom, she gave them the privilege of coming to her at stated times to talk over questions and matters which worried or puzzled them, such as morals, ethics, rules for social life, attitude toward those who were inclined to bad habits, etc.

Remaining in the school for six years, she felt that conditions made it advisable to enter a field of work where her ideals for girls' education could have freer scope. Two offers were made her, one to take charge of a girls' school in Montana, and another in St. Louis. She refused both— entertaining the idea of establishing such a one as would enable her to carry out her plans unrestrictedly. About that time, Martha H. Matthews, who had been a very successful principal of Hosmer Hall in St. Louis, died, and she felt that this was her opportunity for establishing a school for girls. Lenox Hall, a high-grade resident and day school for girls and young women, was established by M. Louise Thomas, the principal, in September 1907. 

The editor of The World's Work issued a Hand Book of Schools in 1912 as a guide to parents considering the school question. Thomas was requested to contribute one of the two articles allotted to schools for girls only; the others being written by such men as professors of Columbia University, editors of magazines, presidents of well-known schools, etc. She contributed frequently to magazines and periodicals, both prose and poetry, and one of the poems which she sent out as a New Year's greeting to the patrons of the school was adopted by the president of the Mothers' Congress of Texas to send to members of the different branches throughout the State as her greeting for 1913, being printed very neatly in booklet form. 

As an educator, Thomas ranked among the best. She was highly cultured, and was gracious and charming in manner. Her strong personality endeared her to all of her pupils.

In 1888, Thomas served as a founding member and officer of the National and International Council for Women alongside Susan B. Anthony.

Personal life
M. Louise Russell married J.D. Thomas and had three children: Russell A. Thomas (died in 1895), Raydell T. Watson (1891-1974) and Louise Le Noir Thomas. Louise Le Noir Thomas followed her mother example as an advocate of women's suffrage and a member of the Equal Suffrage League of St. Louis. She attended Smith College and engaged in a variety of athletic pursuit. After college she became a writer and worked in advertising and advocated for women's self-defense as an extension of the quest for political equality.

M. Louise Thomas died in 1947, and is buried at Bellefontaine Cemetery, Saint Louis.

References

1861 births
1947 deaths
Burials at Bellefontaine Cemetery
People from Columbia, Missouri
People from St. Louis
Educators from Missouri
American women educators